The LaGrange Standard & News is a newspaper located in LaGrange, Indiana, United States of America. The newspaper serves all of LaGrange County and covers local news, sports, business, and community events. It is published weekly on Mondays and delivered via the United States Postal Service. The Standard was founded by John K. Marrow in 1856. It became the first Republican newspaper in LaGrange County. The newspaper is known for its coverage on reform of laws, local railroad development, abolition of saloons, the progressive movement in 1912, and municipal improvements. The Standard is notably cited in the book Shipshewana: an Indiana Amish Community for their coverage on the Amish community in LaGrange County.

Ownership History 
 John K. Marrow: 1857–1859
 John D. Defrees: 1859–1860
 Charles O. Meyers: 1860–1863
 Thomas S. Taylor: 1863–1867
 John H. Rerick: 1867–1869
 John D. Devor: 1869–1872
 John D. Rerick: 1872–1911
 Rowland H. Rerick: 1914–1925
 William Connelly
 Don Hurd

References 

Newspapers published in Indiana
LaGrange County, Indiana
Publications established in 1856
1856 establishments in Indiana